Edward William Cole, also known as "E. W. Cole of the Book Arcade", (4 January 183216 December 1918) was a bookseller and founder of the Cole's Book Arcade, Melbourne, Victoria, Australia.

Early life
Cole was born at Woodchurch near Tenterden, Kent, England, to Harriet Cole, on January 4, 1832. Harriet's husband, Amos Cole, was on the hulks in Plymouth at the time of Edward's conception and therefore Amos could not be Edward's father, whose identity remains unknown. Harriet herself was both illegitimate and illiterate. Cole received little formal education and he himself confirmed that "he had as a boy only six months' schooling."
 
When Cole was 4, despite no record of a divorce, his mother Harriet married again to Thomas Watson, on 27 February 1836, just two months before Amos was transported to Van Diemen's Land on 24 April, 1836. Aged 18, Cole moved to London in 1850 with £20. On 14 April 1850, he migrated to the Cape Colony aboard the 'Dalhousie' and had some success as a farmer and enjoyed botanical explorations. On November 11, 1852 Cole arrived at Cole's Wharf (no relation) in the Yarra in Melbourne Victoria. He spent some time on the diggings at various jobs.

Bookseller
On 30 September 1865, Cole started a bookshop at the Eastern market, Melbourne, with a stock of 600 volumes. His total takings at the end of October amounted to £15 12s., most of which was spent in buying fresh stock. He gradually prospered moving to bigger and better stalls. Though Cole had little education he read a great deal, and in 1867, under the pseudonym of "Edwic", he published The Real Place in History of Jesus and Paul, which is largely a discussion on the validity of miracles. The last paragraph of the book stated that it had been written largely to show what Jesus was not, and that he hoped to publish another book showing "what he really was and Paul also, namely that they were two honest visionaries". No one in Melbourne or Sydney would publish it.

With the pending redevelopment of the Eastern Market, in December 1873 Cole moved to a building a little further down Bourke Street, and opened a book shop grandly named "Coles Book Arcade", where his flair for publicity made it a success. Meanwhile, the new Eastern Market had opened in 1879, but it was not a success, most vendors finding better conditions and lower rents at the Queen Victoria Market. Cole offered to rent the whole of the market in 1881, to which the City of Melbourne agreed. He engaged a band, spent a comparatively large sum on advertising, and made the market a popular resort, rather than a place to buy fresh food, a model which proved a success. After one year, Council did not renew the lease, hoping to capitalise on Cole's initiative, but it was never again so popular. Cole then began negotiations for a building further down Bourke Street near the General Post Office.

Cole's Book Arcade

Cole's Book Arcade was opened in its new location on 27 January 1883 and grew into one of the great book businesses of Australia. It became known as "the prettiest sight in Melbourne". Such was its renown that Cole's Book Arcade was visited by writers Rudyard Kipling and Mark Twain during their travels to Australia. The shop was a huge three story space, with new books on the ground floor, used books on the first, and knick-knacks on the top. Over the years it expanded in size and variety of offerings, such as a music department and cafe, and a small orchestra played on the first floor at lunchtimes.  Eventually it ran right through to Collins Street and incorporated buildings on either side. The statement that there was once a stock of two million books is manifestly absurd, but the arcade certainly had one of the largest stocks of books in the world. Members of the public were invited to walk through the arcade, and to spend as much time as they liked turning over the books or even reading them, with no pressure to purchase. The business continued to prosper and Cole eventually opened various new departments including one of printing.

Funny Picture Books
He compiled and published a large number of popular books, of which the Cole's Funny Picture Book series, which was launched with great publicity on Christmas Eve 1879, and Cole's Fun Doctor were most successful, their sales running into many hundreds of thousands. Another publication (early 1900s) was Cole's Treasury of Song, A Collection of the Most Popular Songs [Old and New] containing about a thousand songs.

Other publishing activities
Under the "W. T. Cole" and "Cole's Book Arcade" imprints, Cole published books on many subjects from war and peace to spiritualism, from popular works of adventure and humour to volumes of sheet music and the great literary classics. He also published many book series, including the Federation of the World Library, the Cream of Human Thought Library, the Commonwealth Library,  Cole's Commonwealth Music Books and Coles Useful Books. Authors published ranged from Henry Lawson to W. T. Stead.

Horticulture books
Cole also had great success publishing gardening and horticultural literature. Cole’s Penny Garden Guide was abridged from the Law Somner and Co. Handbook to the Garden (1880), a device much used by Cole. His biggest garden success was Cole’s Australasian Gardening and Domestic Floriculture (1897) by William Elliott. He also published Hamilton McEwin’s The Fruitgrower’s Handbook, and reprinted others, such as John Lockley’s Rose Growing Made Easy, under his imprint. Cole’s The Happifying Gardening Hobby (1918), an endearing anthology of words and pictures, embodied his altruistic wish for universal health and happiness. Historian Ken Duxbury describes this work as a "sort of horticultural version" of Cole’s Funny Picture Book. Cole also edited a booklet entitled Cotton Growing: The Coming Leading Industry in Australia in 1905 and in 1913, the second edition of The Fruitgrower’s Handbook. Over the next two years, he published two works by A. E. Cole (no relation) The Bouquet: Australian Flower Gardening and The Australian Floral Almanac.

Current affairs
In the final years of his life Cole penned a number of pamphlets on social and political issues. These included A White Australia Impossible (1898) and The White Australia Question (1903), anti-racist tracts directed against the White Australia policy. His fervent opposition to the policy led to him making a six month visit to Japan with his wife and two daughters in 1902. During the First World War he also compiled booklets, such as War (1917), denouncing armed conflict.

Personal life and legacy

Cole married Eliza Frances Jordan in 1875; she predeceased him, dying on 15 March 1911. They lived in a flat above the arcade. Cole himself died in Melbourne on 16 December 1918 and was buried in Boroondara Cemetery. Two sons and three daughters outlived him.

Cole's establishment had a considerable effect on the culture of Melbourne. Cole has been dubbed a "marketing genius", with his Book Arcade being an integral part of "Marvellous Melbourne" and designed as a "carnival, a place to see and be seen", a "shop like no other, crammed with new and second-hand books and other wares, but with the atmosphere of a circus", and enticing customers of all ages in "with a menagerie and fernery, a band, a clockwork symphonion and other mechanical delights", while its main business remained the selling of books. Its proprietor, E. W. Cole, was moreover an "optimist and idealist, believing passionately in the power of education and envisaged a world without borders", views which he expounded through his books and pamphlets.

The business was continued for about ten years after his death, when the executors decided to close it and sell the properties, which had now become very valuable. A member of his family bought the goodwill, and the shop was continued for another ten years in Swanston Street on a comparatively small scale.

References

Further reading
 Broinowski, Richard, Under the Rainbow: The Life and Times of E.W. Cole, Melbourne University Publishing, 2020.
 Dean, George D., A Handbook on E. W. Cole, His Book Arcade, Tokens and Medals, Tarragindi, Queensland: G. D. & G. F. Dean, 1988.
Macartney, Frederick T. (1955). Furnley Maurice (Frank Wilmot). Sydney: Angus & Robertson. Frank Wilmot was an Australian poet who was a manager at the Book Arcade for many years.
Ruljancich, Sally, "Cole's Book Arcade", in Andrew Brown-May and Shurlee Swain (eds), The Encyclopedia of Melbourne, Melbourne: Cambridge University Press, 2005.
 at gutenberg.net.au
 Tout-Smith, Deborah, Cole's Book Arcade Collection, Museums Victoria Collections, n.d.
 Turnley, E. Cole, "Cole, Edward William (1832–1918)", Australian Dictionary of Biography, Volume 3, Melbourne University Press, 1969, pp. 438–440.
 Turnley, E. Cole, Cole of the Book Arcade: A Pictorial Biography of E.W. Cole, Hawthorn, Victoria: Cole Publications, 1974.

External links
 E. W. Cole - website devoted to Cole with Publications, Tokens, Biographical and Chronology sections
 The life and times of EW Cole, Richard Broinowski, author of Under the Rainbow: The Life and Times of E.W. Cole interviewed by Phillip Adams, ABC's Radio National, 3 September 2020
 
 
  
 War by E. W. Cole (1917) - digital edition at State Library of New South Wales
Photo of E. W. Cole (Electronic Encyclopedia of Gold in Australia) from State Library of Victoria's Pictures Collection
Photo of Mrs E. W. Cole in the Coles Book Arcade, c. 1901 at State Library of Victoria
E. W. Cole at AustLit 
E. W. Cole at www.whitehat.com.au
 Collection of E.W. Cole ephemera, ca. 1883-ca. 1910 at State Library of New South Wales
 Cole's Book Arcade items in Museums Victoria collections
 Medal - E.W. Cole, Cole's Book Arcade, Victoria, Australia, 1918 at Museum Victoria
 The world's language, token from Cole's Book Arcade, Melbourne, ca. 1885 (realia) at National Library of Australia

1832 births
1918 deaths
People from Woodchurch, Kent
Businesspeople from Melbourne
Culture of Melbourne
English emigrants to Australia
Australian booksellers
Australian publishers (people)
Australian bibliophiles
Australian book and manuscript collectors
19th-century Australian businesspeople